The Democratic Party leadership election was held on 2 October 1994 for the 30-member 1st Central Committee of the new Democratic Party in Hong Kong, including chairman and two vice-chairman posts. It was held at the first party congress on the establishment day of the Democratic Party. Well-known popular democrat activist, Chairman of the United Democrats of Hong Kong Martin Lee became the first Chairman, while Anthony Cheung, the Chairman of the Meeting Point, and Yeung Sum became the two Vice-Chairmen.

Central Committee
The 1st Central Committee was formed as following:
 Chairman: Martin Lee
 Vice-Chairmen: Anthony Cheung, Yeung Sum
 Secretary: Law Chi-kwong
 Treasurer: Andrew Fung Wai-kwong
 Executive Committee Members:

 Cheung Yuet-lan
 Cheung Man-kwong
 Cheung Yin-tung
 Fung Ho-lap
 Albert Ho Chun-yan
 Lee Chik-yuet
 Lee Wing-tat
 Fred Li Wah-ming
 Luk Shun-tim
 Szeto Wah

 Central Committee Members:

 Chan Kwok-leung
 Josephine Chan Shu-ying
 Andrew Cheng Kar-foo
 Fung Chi-wood
 Peggy Ha Ving-vung
 Hung Wing-tat
 Lai Kwok-hung
 Lam Wing-yin
 Lo Chi-kin
 Mak Hoi-wah
 Stanley Ng Wing-fai 
 Sin Chung-kai
 John Tse Wing-ling
 Tsui Hon-kwong
 Yuen Bun-keung

References

Political party leadership elections in Hong Kong
Democratic Party (Hong Kong)
1994 in Hong Kong
1994 elections in Asia
Democratic Party (HK) leadership election